Abitovo (Äbet) is a rural locality (a village) in Abitovsky Selsoviet of Meleuzovsky District, Bashkortostan, Russia. Its population was 222 as of 2010. There are three streets in the village.

Geography 
Abitovo is located 33 km east of Meleuz (the district's administrative centre) by road. Itkuchukovo is the nearest rural locality.

Ethnicity 
The village is inhabited by Bashkirs.

References 

Rural localities in Meleuzovsky District